Rajnandgaon is a Lok Sabha constituency in the Indian state of Chhattisgarh.

Assembly segments
Rajnandgaon Lok Sabha constituency is composed of the following eight assembly segments:

Members of Parliament

^ by poll

Election results

See also
 Rajnandgaon
 List of Constituencies of the Lok Sabha

References

Lok Sabha constituencies in Chhattisgarh
Rajnandgaon district
Kabirdham district